Rayno Shannon Benjamin (born 3 August 1983) is a South African rugby union footballer who plays as a wing or centre for Japanese Top East League side Shimizu Blue Sharks.

Career

He started out his career in the Western Cape with the Boland Cavaliers and his impressive performances saw him earn Super Rugby honours with the Stormers during the 2006 Super 14 season. He switched to Bloemfontein in 2007 for his first spell with the Cheetahs. He stayed there for 2 seasons before spending the next couple of years focusing on his rugby sevens career.

He returned to the 15 man game in 2011 and started his second spell with the Cheetahs which has seen him make more than 70 appearances in Currie Cup and Super Rugby matches.

International

Benjamin has been a long term member of the Blitzbokke squad and has played in 11 IRB Sevens World Series events between 2006 and 2009. In 2013, he was included in the squad for the 2013 Rugby World Cup Sevens

References

Living people
1983 births
People from Saldanha Bay Local Municipality
Cape Coloureds
South African rugby union players
Cheetahs (rugby union) players
Free State Cheetahs players
Stormers players
Golden Lions players
Lions (United Rugby Championship) players
Boland Cavaliers players
Rugby union wings
South Africa international rugby sevens players
Rugby sevens players at the 2010 Commonwealth Games
Commonwealth Games bronze medallists for South Africa
Commonwealth Games rugby sevens players of South Africa
Commonwealth Games medallists in rugby sevens
Shimizu Koto Blue Sharks players
Rugby union centres
Medallists at the 2010 Commonwealth Games